Michelle Yesudas is a Malaysian lawyer and human rights activist. She was a key activist and coordinator in the Malaysian human rights and law reform NGO, Lawyers for Liberty, where she notably acted as the defence counsel of activist Ali Abd Jalil. After her move to Amnesty International, she has been researching and campaigning against the 'war on drugs' in the Philippines and intends to work on defending human rights defenders in South East Asia. Currently, Yesudas is working with the International Commission of Jurists in Yangon, Myanmar as a Senior Legal Expert.

Early life
Yesudas obtained a Bachelor of Laws from the University of London before obtaining a Master of Law at the University of Warwick.

References

Malaysian people of Indian descent
21st-century Malaysian lawyers
Malaysian democracy activists
Malaysian human rights activists
Malaysian women's rights activists
Year of birth missing (living people)
Living people
Malaysian Christians
Malaysian women lawyers
Alumni of the University of London
Alumni of the University of Warwick